The Piano Quartet No. 1 in D major, Op. 23 (B. 53), is a piano quartet by Antonín Dvořák. Composed during an 18-day period in 1875, it was premiered on 16 December 1880 in Prague.

Structure 
The composition consists of three movements:

A typical performance takes approximately 35 minutes.

References

External links 
 
 , performed by the Dvořák Piano Quartet

1875 compositions
Compositions in D major
Piano quartets by Antonín Dvořák